This is a list of yearly Mid-States Football Association standings.

Mid-States Football Association standings

NAIA Division I (1994–1996)

NAIA (1997–present)

References

Mid-States Football Association
Mid-States Football Association
Standings